Reyhanlı (ar-Rayḥānīyah) is a town and district of Hatay Province, on the Mediterranean coast of Turkey, near the country's border with Syria.

History 
Formerly known as İrtah (Artah) and Reyhaniye, Reyhanlı has been settled by Turks since the 16th century especially with Turkish "muhacir" (refugees), Turkic tribes from Rey and later in the 19th century from the Caucasus and Cyprus. Its southernmost environ, Yenişehir, is thought to be near the ancient village of Imma (or Immae), involved in the Battle of Immae in 272 and probably also with the so-called Battle of Antioch of 218.

The 2013 Reyhanlı car bombings were a terrorist attack that involved the explosion of two car bombs in Reyhanlı on 11 May 2013. 51 people were killed, and 140 more were injured in the attack. The car bombs were left outside Reyhanlı's town hall and post office. The first exploded at around 13:45 local time, (10:45 UTC) and the second exploded about 15 minutes later. People attempting to help those injured in the first explosion were caught in the second blast. At that time, the attack was the deadliest single act of terrorism in the history of modern Turkey, only to be surpassed by the 103 victims of the 2015 Ankara bombings.

On 5 July 2019, another car bombing in the town killed 3 people.

Geography 
The climate is typical of the Mediterranean region, and Reyhanlı is an agricultural district watered from Reyhanlı reservoir, growing cotton, wheat and other grains and raising cattle, sheep and goats.

The town lies on the main road between İskenderun and Aleppo in Syria.

References 

Populated places in Hatay Province
Districts of Hatay Province
Towns in Turkey